Gager may refer to:

Gager (municipality), in the Vorpommern-Rügen district, in Mecklenburg-Vorpommern, Germany
C. Stuart Gager (1873–1943), American botanist
John Gager (born 1937), American academic  
William Gager (1555–1622), English jurist